ZZZ, Zzz, zZz, or zzz may refer to:

 Zzz, a cross-linguistic onomatopoeia for snoring
 A series of Zs in a speech balloon, a comic book convention for snoring

Music
 zZz, a Dutch band from Amsterdam
 "ZZZ" (song), a 2016 song by Empire of the Sun from the album Two Vines
 ZZZ (EP), a 2018 album by Zion.T
 Zzz, a song produced by Kenichi Maeyamada performed by Sayaka Sasaki
 "Zzz", a silent track on the 2014 album Sleepify by Vulfpeck

Other uses
 Związek Związków Zawodowych, a 1930s Polish trade union confederation
 ZZZ, the production code for the 1974 Doctor Who serial Planet of the Spiders
 Zenless Zone Zero  (Chinese: 绝区零; pinyin: Jué qū líng), video game developed by HoYoverse
 Emoji 
 Emoji

See also
 Z (disambiguation)
 ZZ (disambiguation)
 Zzzz (disambiguation)
 Zero Zero Zero, a 1998 compilation album by Sam Phillips